Otto Kundert (July 26, 1888 – January 9, 1950) was an American politician.

From Java, South Dakota, Kundert served in the South Dakota House of Representatives from 1937 to 1942, from Campbell County, South Dakota, as a Republican. His daughter Alice Kundert and his son Gust Kundert also served in the South Dakota House of Representatives.

Notes

1888 births
1950 deaths
People from Campbell County, South Dakota
Republican Party members of the South Dakota House of Representatives
People from Walworth County, South Dakota
20th-century American politicians